Aryantaj Tajbakhsh (born 20 October 1990) is an English professional footballer who plays as a midfielder for Kings Langley.

Club career
Tajbakhsh, who was known as Aryan Taj early in his career, was in the youth team at Kentish Town before joining Northwood. He signed for Barnet at the start of the 2008–09 season and appeared on the bench for first team games, but did not play. Later that season he played for Potters Bar Town and Maidenhead United, before moving to Turkey to play for Antalyaspor in the Süper Lig. Tajbakhsh never played for the first team, but he did play 12 times for the reserves in A2 Ligi, before a spell on loan at Yalovaspor (TFF Third League) and then Pendikspor (TFF Second League). Tajbakhsh then played for Braintree Town, Billericay Town, Harrow Borough, Farnborough, Maidenhead United, Walton & Hersham, Potters Bar Town, St Albans City, Aveley, Cheshunt, Ware, VCD Athletic, Enfield Town, Hendon and Cray Wanderers. While at Enfield Town, Tajbakhsh played in matches while suspended, leading to a three-point deduction for Town which led them to miss out on the Isthmian League playoffs in 2014–15, despite Town identifying that Aryan's former clubs had not correctly reported his personal details when informing the FA of bookings incurred when he was playing for them.

Tajbakhsh joined Crawley Town on 12 July 2016, and made his professional debut for Crawley on 30 August 2016, in an EFL Trophy match against Colchester United. On 17 February 2017, Tajbakhsh joined National League South side Wealdstone on a 28-day loan. A day later, he scored on his Wealdstone debut in their 1–0 victory over Margate, netting in the 45th minute. On 17 March 2017, his loan spell at Wealdstone was extended for a further month. Tajbakhsh left Crawley at the end of his contract in June 2018. He rejoined Braintree on trial in July 2018, scoring twice in a pre-season win over Ipswich Town. He signed for Dover Athletic in August 2018. He moved to Maidstone United in November 2018, and to Dulwich Hamlet in February 2019. Tajbakhsh joined Potters Bar Town in August 2021, before joining Kings Langley in February 2022.

International career
Tajbakhsh was called up to the Barawa football team for the 2018 ConIFA World Football Cup.

Personal life
Tajbakhsh is of Turkish and Iranian descent. His brother Noyan (born 1996) is also a footballer and was in the youth team at Fenerbahçe.

Career statistics

References

1990 births
Living people
English footballers
Northwood F.C. players
Barnet F.C. players
Potters Bar Town F.C. players
Maidenhead United F.C. players
Antalyaspor footballers
Yalovaspor footballers
Pendikspor footballers
Braintree Town F.C. players
Billericay Town F.C. players
Harrow Borough F.C. players
Farnborough F.C. players
Walton & Hersham F.C. players
St Albans City F.C. players
Aveley F.C. players
Cheshunt F.C. players
Ware F.C. players
VCD Athletic F.C. players
Enfield Town F.C. players
Hendon F.C. players
Cray Wanderers F.C. players
Crawley Town F.C. players
Wealdstone F.C. players
Dover Athletic F.C. players
Maidstone United F.C. players
Dulwich Hamlet F.C. players
Kings Langley F.C. players
National League (English football) players
Isthmian League players
Southern Football League players
Association football midfielders
Footballers from Hendon
English expatriate footballers
English expatriate sportspeople in Turkey
Expatriate footballers in Turkey
English people of Turkish descent
English people of Iranian descent
English Football League players
Sportspeople of Iranian descent